Sampit Airport (also known as H. Asan Airport ), is a public airport in Sampit, Central Kalimantan, Indonesia. It is located on the island of Kalimantan, also known as Borneo. It is able to accommodate Airbus A320 and Boeing 737-sized aircraft.

The airport is located 6 km North East of the city center.

Airlines and destinations

Former Airlines

Kalstar Aviation, Merpati Nusantara Airlines, Xpress Air

References

External links

Indonesia Airport Global Website

Airports in Central Kalimantan